Michael Garcia (born 22 March 1977 in Australia) is an Australian retired soccer player.

Career

According to Garcia, "there was always banter between teammates about which state was the best” while he played for Canberra Cosmos.

After playing professionally in the Singaporean S.League, he rejoined Perth Glory, before retiring at the end of 2002/03 aged 25 due to injury.

References

External links
 

Australian soccer players
Living people
1977 births
Association football midfielders
Perth Glory FC players